The Air National Guard Readiness Center (ANGRC) is based at Joint Base Andrews, Maryland, and performs operational and technical functions to ensure combat readiness of Air National Guard units and is a channel of communication between the National Guard Bureau and the states on Air National Guard operational activities.

The commander is responsible for four detachments and 23 operating locations with an authorized strength of 734 military and civilian personnel. Its mission is to provide service and support to the Air National Guard and help accomplish its total Air Force mission.

It was established as the Air National Guard Support Center, and activated as a direct reporting unit, on June 1, 1979. Effective February 5, 1991, its status was changed from a direct reporting unit to a field operating agency. It was re-designated as Air National Guard Readiness Center on June 1, 1992

Commanders 
 Brig Gen R. Scott Williams 5 Aug 2012
 Col Mark Sheehan 3 Jun 2012
 Brig Gen Brian G. Neal 16 Aug 2010
 Col Michael J. McDonald 27 Jul 2009
 Col G. Kevin Thompson 8 Jun 2009
 Brig Gen Joseph L. Lengyel 10 Oct 2006 
 Col Michael E. Hillestad 21 Dec 2004
 Brig Gen David A. Brubaker 16 Nov 2001
 Maj Gen Paul A. Weaver, Jr. 18 May 2001
 Brig Gen Craig R. McKinley 28 Jan 1998
 Brig Gen Paul A. Weaver, Jr. 25 Oct 1996
 Maj Gen Donald W. Shepperd 17 Apr 1995
 Brig Gen Larry K. Arnold 4 Dec 1989
 Maj Gen Philip G. Killey 1 Nov 1988
 Maj Gen John B. Conaway 1 Apr 1981
 Maj Gen John T. Guice 21 Oct 1976

See also
 Andrews Air Force Base
 Air Force District of Washington
 National Capital Region (United States)
 Continental Air Command
 Air Force Reserve Command

Notes

References
 AFHRA history Air National Guard Readiness Center

Attribution

External links
 Official website

Military units and formations established in 1979
Military in Washington, D.C.
Centers of the United States Air Force